Antarctica was an American indie rock band from New York, existing from 1995 until 1999, generally considered post-rock, shoegazing, or electronica, having been compared with early Cure.  Their output consisted of two well-regarded releases, and individual members have been in other bands before and since Antarctica.

Members
Eric Richter (formerly of Christie Front Drive) – vocals, guitar
Chris Donohue (subsequently in Ova Looven) – vocals, guitar, programming
Ben Zimmerman – bass
Glenn Maryansky (subsequently in Blacklist and Ova Looven) – drums
Nicole Waxenblatt – keyboards, programming, mixing

Discography
23:03 (1997, EP, File 13)
81:03 (1999, 2xCD, File 13)

References

External links 
 Last FM
 File 13 Records

American post-rock groups
Electronica music groups
Indie rock musical groups from New York (state)
Musical groups disestablished in 1999
Musical groups established in 1995
American shoegaze musical groups